New Hampshire's 19th State Senate district is one of 24 districts in the New Hampshire Senate. It has  been represented by Republican Regina Birdsell since 2014, succeeding fellow Republican Jim Rausch.

Geography
District 19 covers the Rockingham County towns of Derry, Hampstead, and Windham.

The district overlaps with both New Hampshire's 1st congressional district and New Hampshire's 2nd congressional district.

Recent election results

2020

2018

2016

2014

2012

Federal and statewide results in District 19

References

19
Rockingham County, New Hampshire